Mei Chaofeng (梅超風; Méi Chāofēng), original name Mei Ruohua (梅若華; Méi Ruòhuá), is a character in the wuxia novel The Legend of the Condor Heroes by Jin Yong. She was the fourth disciple of Huang Yaoshi. She was known as the Iron Corpse (鐵屍) due to her dark complexion and rigid appearance. She, along with her eloped husband Chen Xuanfeng, were despised by the martial arts community for unethical behaviour. She later become the teacher of Yang Kang. She died in battle against Ouyang Feng while attempting to save her teacher, Huang Yaoshi.

The 2021 film The Legend of the Condor Heroes: The Cadaverous Claw features Mei Chaofeng as the main character. It depicts her life and romantic relationship with Huang.

Early life 
Mei's parents died in her youth. Her uncle, unable to raise her, sold her to the rich Jiang family. One day, Huang bought Mei from the Jiang family and took her back to Peach Blossom Island to become his third disciple. While there she fell in love with fellow disciple Chen Xuanfeng. They were afraid to seek their master Huang's approval for their marriage due to his ruthless and erratic nature, so they decided to elope and steal the second volume of their master's prized martial arts article, Jiu Yin Zhen Jing (九陰真經), in order to become stronger than Huang and avoid his pursuit.

Mei and Chen were persecuted by the rest of the martial arts community, primarily because of their unethical methods (such as deceitful use of poison and unnecessarily cruel methods of killing, demonstrated in their notorious Nine Yin White Bone Claw [九陰白骨爪]). Many more, however, were keen to obtain the prized manual. The couple was forced to flee to Mongolia, where they encountered mortal enemies Jiangnan Qi Guai (江南七怪), ("Seven Freaks of Jiangnan"), headed by Ke Zhen'e. Ke Zhen'e had previously been blinded by Mei, and his brother slain. In the ensuing encounter, Ke Zhen'e returned the favor, blinding Mei. Chen tried to even the odds taking the young Guo Jing hostage. Guo stabbed wildly at Chen, and was able to strike the navel, an area unprotected by Chen's martial abilities. Mei escaped with Chen's body after Chen was accidentally killed by Guo. She then proceeded to remove the skin, which was tattooed with the stolen Jiu Ying Zhen Jing, off Chen's back.

Mei continued to perfect her claw techniques in Mongolia, but was forced to flee when she mistakenly thought she encountered The Seven Disciples of Quanzhen, a powerful group of martial artists. The group she encountered was in fact the Seven Freaks, in collaboration with the head disciple of Quanzhen Ma Yu, aiming to scare her away.

Mei found refuge in the courts of Wanyan Honglie, a Jin prince and adopted father of Yang Kang. The young Yang accidentally stumbled upon Mei's refuge; in exchange for keeping the secret and helping her practice, Mei agreed to teach Yang the powerful Nine Yin White Bone Claw (九陰白骨爪). Mei was herself crippled by incorrect application of the Jiu Yin Zhen Jing when she chanced upon Guo, at the time still her inferior. Mei was about to kill Guo for his role in Chen's death, but when she found out the he knew the methods to cure her (as well as furthering her martial arts skills), she agreed to help him fight his enemies.

Eventually, Guo and the Seven Freaks would face off with Mei again, and with Guo's improved skills, they managed to defeat Mei. She was killed by Ouyang Feng by intercepting a fatal blow, as Ouyang Feng attempted to attack her master from behind during a battle with the Seven Masters of Quanzhen. Before dying, Mei shattered her bones and sinews in order to fulfill an earlier promise to her master. Before she died, Huang re-initiated her as a member of Peach Blossom Island. It was a wish that every one of Huang's banished disciples greatly desired but ironically, these brethren of Mei who had been implicated by her treachery never saw this wish fulfilled.

Martial arts and skills

Peach Blossom Island Martial Arts 
As a disciple of Huang Yaoshi, learning martial arts at Peach Blossom Island, Mei Chaofeng learned the skills of Huang Yaoshi. It is unknown what these skills were.

Nine Yin White Bone Claw 
Mei Chaofeng and Chen Xuanfeng stole Huang's martial arts manual, Jiu Yin Zhen Jing and mastered the skills it described. Due to a lack of understanding and her desire to learn the skills quickly, she and Chen studied the Nine Yin White Bone Claw (Jiuyin Baigu Zhua) without training their internal energy. The wrong training of the skill and the lack of understanding of the manual led her and Chen Xuanfeng to practise a very evil way of training and eventually harm themselves.

Third edition
Jin Yong added the deep relation between Huang Yaoshi and Mei Chaofeng in the third edition. She was later portrayed as falling in love with her teacher Huang Yaoshi in the film The Legend of the Condor Heroes The Cadaverous Claw and series The Romance of the Condor Heroes.

In other media

Mei Chaofeng was a playable character in the 2008 PC fighting game Street Fighter Online: Mouse Generation.

References

  Tan, Xianmao (2005). Qin Nanqin: A Character Worthy of Memory. In Rankings of Jin Yong's Characters. Chinese Agricultural Press.

The Legend of the Condor Heroes
Condor Trilogy
Jin Yong characters
Fictional adoptees
Fictional Song dynasty people
Fictional women soldiers and warriors
Literary characters introduced in 1959
Orphan characters in literature
Fighting game characters